Vietnam Veedu Sundaram was an Indian playwright, screenwriter and film director. He wrote films such as Gauravam, Vietnam Veedu, Gnana Oli, Satyam, Grihapravesam, Justice Gopinath, Annan Oru Koyil, Naan Yen Pirandhen and Naalai Namadhe. He also directed a few films and is well known for his family themes. He written stories films in languages such as Telugu, Kannada and Hindi. He also worked as an actor in films and television.

Early life

Sundaram was born in 1943 to a lawyer father in Tiruchirappalli, Tamil Nadu. His mother brought him to Madras in 1945 to see Mahatma Gandhi at Island Grounds. As he was not well-educated, he was made to work in a factory even at a very young age. In 1955-56 he joined Dunlop factory as a machine operator. In the meantime, he was also working as a service boy in United Amateur Artistes run by Y.G. Parthasarathy, his wife and Pattu. That kindled his interest in drama and cinema. He narrated real life incidents with imagination and make it an interesting story. This made him a good storyteller among his friends. Slowly he graduated himself in theatrics and play writing. Soon he became a good screenplay and dialogue writer.

Film career

He was the mastermind behind creating the highly successful play "Vietnam Veedu," hence the prefix for his name. Vietnam Veedu Sundaram played the hat-trick in films too with the same titles, all acted by the Nadigar Thilagam Sivaji Ganesan, the Thespian of Indian cinema. He is known as the 'founder' of social mythology. The well known movies which he wrote include Vietnam Veedu, Gnana Oli, Naan En Piranden, Naalai Namadhe, Satyam, Gruhapravesam, Justice Gopinath, Anaan Oru Koyil, Oru Malarin Payanam, Navagraha Nayaki, Geethanjali, Aayiram Kannudayaal, Dharmam, Piranthen Valarthen, Nambinar Keduvathillai, Jallikattu, Raja Mariyadhai, Velundu Vinaiyillai, Soora Samhaaram. He also wrote story for Kannada film Anupama. He gained national fame for writing the story for 1978 Hindi film Devata starring Sanjev Kumar in the lead. He cast the ever green K. R. Vijaya in the role of goddess in "Namma Veetu Deivam", the first time social mythology in Tamil, which was remade into Malayalam, Telugu and Kannada. That set the social mythology trend in films and televisions. He has directed more than dozen films and is well known for his family themes with one of them Gauravam being a cult classic. His stories have been made into films in other languages also. He started acting in films since 1999.He turned actor on the small screen from 1998 and has to his credit quite a few television serials. He has worked as a writer  for films with many popular stars including M. G. Ramachandran, Sivaji Ganesan, Rajinikanth, Kamal Haasan, K. R. Vijaya, Sathyaraj and Karthik.

Death
Sundaram died on 6 August 2016 at the age of 76 due to age related ailments. He is survived by his wife Chella and daughter Anu Parthasarathy who is a costume designer.

Awards and nominations

"Vietnam Veedu" Sundaram won the Tamil Nadu State Film Award for Best Dialogue Writer for his magnum opus, Vietnam Veedu in 1970. He also won the Arignar Anna Award in the Tamil Nadu State Film Honorary Award in 1991.

Filmography

Writer
Films
 Vietnam Veedu (1970) - Scriptwriter
 Namma Veettu Deivam (1970) - Dialogue
 Veguli Penn (1971) - Dialogue
 Irulum Oliyum (1971) - Dialogue
 Gnana Oli (1972) - Scriptwriter
 Naan Yen Pirandhen (1972) - Dialogue
 Itho Enthan Deivam (1972) - Dialogue
 Vijaya (1973) - Scriptwriter
Manidharil Manikkam (1973)
 Gauravam (1973) - Scriptwriter
 Kasthuri Vijayam (1975) - Scriptwriter
 Naalai Namadhe (1975) - Scriptwriter
 Panakkara Penn (1976)
 Satyam (1976)
 Gruhapravesam (1976)
Paalootti Valartha Kili (1976)
Thaaliya Salangaiya (1977)
Naam Pirandha Mann (1977)
Thanikudithanam (1977)
 Justice Gopinath (1978)
 Annan Oru Koyil (1978)
Oru Veedu Oru Ulagam (1978)
 Devata (1978) (Hindi)
Allauddinum Albhutha Vilakkum (1979)
Kandhar Alangaram (1979)
Valli Mayil (1980)
Engamma Maharani (1981)
 Anupama (1981) (Kannada)
 Paritchaikku Neramaachu (1982)
Vaa Kanna Vaa (1982)
Thunai (1982)
Nalamthaana (1982)
Garuda Saukiyama (1982)
Anthasthu (1985)
 Oru Malarin Payanam (1985)
 Navagraha Nayagi (1985)
 Geethanjali (1985)
Ammavum Neeye Appavum Neeye (1985)
 Aayiram Kannudayaal (1986)
 Dharmam (1986)
 Piranthaen Valarnthaen (1986)
 Nambinar Keduvathillai (1986)
Brahmastram (1986) (Telugu)
 Anand (1987)
 Jallikattu (1987)
 Raja Mariyadhai (1987)
 Velundu Vinaiyillai (1987)
 Soora Samhaaram (1988)
 Bharatamlo Bala Chandrudu (1988) (Telugu)

Television
Vikramadithyan
En Peyar Ranganayaki
Velan

Director
 Vijaya (1973)
 Gauravam (1973)
 Devi Sri Karumari Amman (1974)
 Payanam (1976)
Kandhar Alangaram (1979)
 Gnana Paravai (1991)

As Actor
Films
Appu (2000)
 Anjaneya (2003)
 Kannamoochi Yenada (2007) - Arumugam Gounder's father
 Kolakalam (2013)
Vandha Mala (2015)
 Namma Kadha (2017)

Television

References

Tamil comedians
Tamil film directors
Tamil screenwriters
1943 births
2016 deaths
20th-century Indian film directors
Writers from Tiruchirappalli
Film directors from Tamil Nadu
Indian male screenwriters
Tamil dramatists and playwrights
Tamil Nadu State Film Awards winners
Indian male television actors
Male actors from Tiruchirappalli
Male actors in Tamil cinema
20th-century Indian dramatists and playwrights
Indian male comedians
Screenwriters from Tamil Nadu
20th-century Indian male writers